Coenodomus schausi is a species of snout moth in the genus Coenodomus. It is known from the Philippines.

References

Moths described in 1931
Epipaschiinae